Ernst Ragnar Rolf (December 31, 1931 – July 14, 2014), better known as Tom Rolf, was a Swedish-born American film editor who worked on at least 48 feature films in a career spanning over fifty years. Most notable among these films are Martin Scorsese's Taxi Driver, for which he was nominated for the 1976 BAFTA Award for Best Editing, and Philip Kaufman's The Right Stuff, for which he and his editing team won the 1983 Oscar for Best Film Editing. Other notable films he edited include WarGames, Jacob's Ladder, Heat and The Horse Whisperer.

A member of the American Cinema Editors (ACE) since the mid-1950s, Rolf served two terms as president of that guild. He also served on the Board of Governors at the Academy of Motion Picture Arts and Sciences for five terms (15 years), representing the editing branch from 1992 through 2007. He received the ACE Career Achievement Award in 2003.

Personal life
Ernst R. Rolf was born in Stockholm, Stockholm County, Sweden on New Year's Eve, 1931, the son of actor Ernst Rolf and Norwegian-born actress Tutta Rolf. After his father's death in 1932, Tutta married American director and choreographer Jack Donohue, who advised the young Ernst to go into film editing.

Rolf worked as a ski patrolman and was a seaman for the Norwegian Merchant Marine before emigrating to the United States, after which he spent three years in the United States Marine Corps. He considered pursuing a career as a film director like his step-father, but Donohue convinced him to first try his hand at film editing, telling him he would "learn everything about directing by being a film editor first."

On July 14, 2014, Rolf died at his home in France due to complications following hip surgery. He was 82.

Editing career

Early years, Levy-Gardiner-Laven and first films of the '70s
At the start of his career, Rolf spent a then-required eight years serving as an apprentice and assistant editor. One of Rolf's earliest jobs as an editor was the 1959 Swedish-American co-production Space Invasion of Lapland. Among the films he worked on as an assistant editor was Levy-Gardner-Laven's 1962 Western Geronimo. Levy-Gardner-Laven later made Rolf one of the head editors of their 1965 Western, The Glory Guys; Rolf's editing partner on this film was Melvin Shapiro, with whom Rolf would work again on Taxi Driver over ten years later.

When Levy-Gardner-Laven began production on the Western television series The Big Valley, they brought in Rolf to serve as one of the editors of the show. He edited nine episodes of the first season, which ran from 1965 to 1966. At the start of the second season, in 1966, he became the show's editorial coordinator, a position he held until the series ended in 1969. In 1967, starting with the third season of The Big Valley, he took on the name "Tom Rolf."

Rolf's first feature film as a solo editor was another Levy-Gardner-Laven production, the 1967 Elvis Presley picture Clambake. Rolf worked on a few more Levy-Gardner-Laven productions, including the 1970 releases Underground (which, like Clambake, was directed by Arthur H. Nadel) and The McKenzie Break. The latter was the first of four films Rolf would edit for director Lamont Johnson; their subsequent collaborations were The Last American Hero (1973), Visit to a Chief's Son (1974) and the 1975 TV movie Fear on Trial. Rolf also edited two 1973 releases for Richard C. Sarafian: Lolly-Madonna XXX and The Man Who Loved Cat Dancing.

Mid-to-late 1970s: Scorsese, Schrader and Frankenheimer
The turning point in Rolf's career came in 1975 when he and Melvin Shapiro were recruited by director Martin Scorsese to edit his crime drama Taxi Driver. Released in 1976, Taxi Driver was nominated for four Academy Awards, including Best Picture, and has come to be considered one of the greatest films of all time. The film also received three BAFTA Awards and  four BAFTA nominations, including one for Rolf, Shapiro, and Marcia Lucas for Best Editing. Scorsese hired Rolf again for his next film, the 1977 musical New York, New York, before Scorsese began working with his regular editor, Thelma Schoonmaker.

Paul Schrader, the writer of Taxi Driver, was so impressed with Rolf that he hired him for his directorial debut, the 1978 drama film Blue Collar, and recruited Rolf again for his second feature, Hardcore. Rolf also edited three films for director John Frankenheimer in the mid-to-late 1970s: French Connection II (1975), Black Sunday (1977) and Prophecy (1979).

The 1980s and beyond
After co-editing Michael Cimino's infamous box office flop Heaven's Gate, Rolf joined the editing team of Philip Kaufman's space race drama The Right Stuff. The film was a critical (if not commercial) success and picked up four Academy Awards, including Best Editing for Rolf and his fellow editors, Glenn Farr, Lisa Fruchtman, Stephen A. Rotter and Douglas Stewart.

Rolf and the Right Stuff editing team were also nominated for an "Eddie" Award from American Cinema Editors (ACE). Although they did not win the award, Rolf himself won that year for his solo work on John Badham's WarGames. According to editor Mark Goldblatt, Rolf's very first cut of WarGames so satisfied Badham that the director signed off on it immediately with no additional notes for the editor. Badham later recruited Rolf for his 1987 crime-comedy Stakeout, though this time the editor was paired up with Michael Ripps.

For director Adrian Lyne, Rolf edited 1986's 9½ Weeks and 1990's Jacob's Ladder. The latter is considered by some, including author and film scholar Vincent LoBrutto, to be a landmark in film editing due to the intricacies and complexities involved in cutting the picture and because it "furthered the montage style of editing and allowed filmmakers to strive for new forms." In 2010, Rolf told The Hollywood Reporter that Jacob's Ladder was the film he enjoyed working on the most, stating he was "very proud of that one."

Rolf also edited or co-edited two films each for Douglas Day Stewart (Thief of Hearts and Quicksilver) and Alan J. Pakula (The Pelican Brief and The Devil's Own). Additionally, he edited two television productions for Lawrence Schiller: the 1981 movie The Executioner's Song and the 2000 miniseries Perfect Murder, Perfect Town. Other notable films which were edited or co-edited by Rolf include Ridley Scott's Black Rain (1989), Michael Mann's Heat (1995), Robert Redford's The Horse Whisperer (1998), John Woo's Windtalkers and Kurt Wimmer's Equilibrium (both 2002).

In 2003, Rolf re-teamed with Blue Collar and Hardcore director Paul Schrader to work on Dominion: Prequel to the Exorcist. It was released in 2005, though Rolf did not receive on-screen credit. The last film Rolf edited was the Russian Alexander Kolchak biopic Admiral, released in 2008.

Selected filmography

Space Invasion of Lapland (1959)
Geronimo (1962) (as assistant editor)
Behold a Pale Horse (1964) (as assistant editor)
The Glory Guys (1965)
The Big Valley - TV series (as editor, 1965–1967; as production coordinator, 1966–1969)
Clambake (1967)
The McKenzie Break (1970)
The Resurrection of Zachary Wheeler (1971) (as writer)
The Man Who Loved Cat Dancing (1973)
The Trial of Billy Jack (1974)
French Connection II (1975)
Taxi Driver (1976) 
Black Sunday (1977)
New York, New York (1977)
Blue Collar (1978)
Hardcore (1979)
Heaven's Gate (1980)
Ghost Story (1981)
The Executioner's Song (1981) - TV movie

WarGames (1983) 
The Right Stuff (1983)
9½ Weeks (1986)
Outrageous Fortune (1987)
Stakeout (1987)
The Great Outdoors (1988)
Black Rain (1989)
Jacob's Ladder (1990)
Sneakers (1992)
Mr. Jones (1993)
The Pelican Brief (1993)
Dangerous Minds (1995)
Heat (1995)
The Devil's Own (1997)
The Horse Whisperer (1998)
Perfect Murder, Perfect Town (2000) - TV miniseries
Windtalkers (2002)
Equilibrium (2002)
Admiral (2008)

References

External links

1931 births
2014 deaths
Best Film Editing Academy Award winners
Swedish film editors
Swedish emigrants to the United States
Artists from Stockholm
American film editors